Lost in the Sun is a 2015 drama thriller film written and directed by Trey Nelson, and starring Josh Duhamel, Josh Wiggins, Lynn Collins, and Emma Fuhrmann.

Synopsis
Louis, a newly orphaned teenager, becomes John's unlikely accomplice. As they progress on the open road, John drags Louis on a crime spree; committing a string of armed robberies, ultimately causing the pair to forge an unexpected and powerful bond.

Cast
Josh Duhamel as John Wheeler
Josh Wiggins as Louis Moody
Lynn Collins as Mary Wheeler
Emma Fuhrmann as Rose Moody
Larry Jack Dotson as Father Walker
Mylinda Royer as Laura Moody
Michael Anthony Jackson as Freddy
Luis Olmeda as Gilbert
Brian Elder as Store Clerk
David Lambert as Store Owner
Robert Johnson as Bank Guard
Margaret Bowman as Ivy

References

External links
 
 
 

2010s road movies
2015 drama films
2015 films
2015 thriller drama films
American road movies
American thriller drama films
Films scored by Daniel Hart
2010s English-language films
2010s American films